The Sun Odyssey 52.2, also called the Jeanneau 52.2, is a French sailboat that was designed by Bruce Farr as a cruiser and first built in 1995.

For the yacht charter market the design was sold as the Moorings 52.2 and the Stardust 535.

Production
The design was built by Jeanneau in France, starting in 1995, but it is now out of production. The shallow fin keel model was discontinued at the end of 1999.

Design
The Sun Odyssey 52.2 is a recreational keelboat, built predominantly of fiberglass, with wood trim. It has a masthead sloop rig, a raked stem, a reverse transom with steps down to swimming platform, an internally mounted spade-type rudder controlled by dual wheels and a fixed deep draft fin keel, shallow draft keel with a weighted bulb or a performance keel. The deep draft fin keel model displaces  and carries  of ballast, the shallow draft version displaces  and carries  of ballast, the performance keel version displaces  and carries  of ballast.

The design has sleeping accommodation for six or eight people in three cabin and four cabin interior arrangements. The three cabin version has an owner's cabin in the bow with a large double berth and two aft cabins. The four cabin version divides the bow cabin into two cabins, with a nonstructural folding bulkhead. The main salon has a "U"-shaped settee and a straight settee, around a table. The galley is located on the starboard side, amidships. The galley is "U"-shaped and is equipped with a three-burner stove, an ice box and a double sink. A navigation station is aft of the galley, on the starboard side. In the three cabin version there are three heads, one in each cabin, with the forward one with a separate shower compartment. The four cabin version adds an extra bow head. For use as a yacht charter boat the forepeak locker can be used as crew quarters.

See also
List of sailing boat types

References

External links

Video tour of a Sun Odyssey 52.2

Keelboats
1990s sailboat type designs
Sailing yachts
Sailboat type designs by Bruce Farr
Sailboat types built by Jeanneau